Donnie or Donny is a familiar form (hypocorism) of the masculine given name Donald, Donal, Don, or Donovan.

It may refer to:

People

Arts and entertainment
 Donny Baldwin, American drummer best known as a member of Jefferson Starship and Starship
Donnie Brooks (1936–2007), American pop music singer
Donnie Dacus, guitarist
Donnie Demers, American songwriter
 Donny Deutsch (born 1957), American advertising executive and television personality
Donnie Dunagan (born 1934), semi-retired American former child actor
Donnie Elbert (1936–1989), American soul singer
Donnie Fritts (born 1942), American session musician and songwriter
 Donnie Hamzik, drummer of the heavy metal band Manowar
 Donny Hathaway (1945–1979), American jazz, blues, soul and gospel singer, songwriter, arranger and pianist
Donnie Iris (born 1943), American rock musician known for his work with the Jaggerz and Wild Cherry
Donnie Keshawarz (born 1969), American stage, film and television actor
Donnie Klang (born 1984), American singer, songwriter
 Donny MacLeod (1932-1984), Scottish television presenter
 Donny McCaslin (born 1966), American jazz saxophonist
Donnie McClurkin (born 1959), American gospel music singer and minister
Donnie Munro (born 1953), Scottish musician
 Donny Osmond (born 1957),  American singer, actor, dancer
Donnie Simpson (born 1954), American radio DJ, television and movie personality
Donnie Van Zant (born 1952), American rock vocalist and guitarist
Donnie Wahlberg (born 1969), American singer, actor and film producer
Donnie Yen (born 1963), Hong Kong actor, martial artist, film director and producer
Donnie (rapper), Canadian rapper

Sports
Donnie Abraham (born 1973), American football cornerback
Donnie Allison (born 1939), American race car driver
Donny Anderson (born 1943), American football player
Donnie Avery (born 1984), American football player
Donnie Beechler (born 1961), American race car driver
Donnie Boyce (born 1973), American basketball player
Donny Brady (born 1973), American football player
Donnie Craft (born 1959), American football player
Donny Crevels (born 1974), Dutch race car driver
Donny Davies (1892–1958), English cricketer, amateur footballer and journalist
Donnie Davis (born 1972), American football player
Donnie Ernsberger (born 1996), American football player
Donnie Edwards (born 1973), American football linebacker
Donny Grant (born 1976), Costa Rican footballer
Donnie Green (born 1948), American former football offensive lineman
Donny Gorter (born 1988), Dutch footballer
Donny de Groot (born 1979), Dutch former footballer
Donnie Henderson (born 1975), American football coach
Donnie Jones (basketball) (born 1966), American college basketball coach and player
Donnie Lewis (born 1997), American football player
Donny Marshall (born 1972), American basketball player
Donnie Meche (born 1974), American jockey
Donnie Moore (1954–1989), American baseball player
Donnie Nelson (born 1962), American basketball executive
Donnie Neuenberger (born 1962), American race car driver
Donnie Nickey (born 1980), American football safety
Donnie Nietes (born 1982), Filipino professional boxer
Donnie Sadler (born 1975), American baseball player
Donny Schmit (1967-1996), American motocross racer
Donnie Shell (born 1952), American football strong safety for the Pittsburgh Steelers
Donnie Smith (born 1990), American soccer player
Donny Toia (born 1992), American soccer player
Donnie Tyndall (born 1970), American head men's basketball coach
Donny van de Beek (born 1997), Dutch footballer
Donnie Walsh (born 1941), American basketball executive
 Donny White, athletics administrator and baseball coach
Donnie Williams (born 1948), American football player
Donnie Wingo (born 1960), American auto racing crew chief

Other fields
Donnie Burns (born 1979), Scottish politician
 Donny Lambeth (born 1965), American politician
 Donny Olson (born 1953), American politician
 Donny George Youkhanna (1950-2011), Iraqi-Assyrian archaeologist, anthropologist, author, curator and professor

Criminals
 Donny Meluda, alias Abdul Rahman Abdullah, a Malaysian ex-fugitive and convicted robber serving a 33-year jail sentence in Singapore for multiple violent robberies.

Aliases and stage names
 "Donnie Brasco", alias of undercover FBI agent Joseph D. Pistone (born 1939)
 Donny Goines, stage name of American rapper Donny Scott
 Donny Montell, stage name of Lithuanian singer-songwriter Donatas Montvydas (born 1987)
 Donny Tourette, stage name of English singer-songwriter Patrick Brannan (born 1981)
 Donny Young, an early stage name of American musician and singer Donald Eugene Lytle (1938-2003), better known as Johnny Paycheck
 Donnie Darko

Animals
Donnie (dog), a Doberman Pinscher known for his penchant for arranging his plush toys in geometric forms

Hypocorisms